Selina Cartmell is a British theatre director based in Dublin, Ireland. She is currently director at the Gate Theatre.

Early life and education 
Cartmell was born in the Lake District, UK. Her mother Annie worked as a midwife and her father Gordon is a retired accountant, and she has three older brothers. She holds a MA (Distinction) from the Royal Central School of Speech and Drama in Advanced Theatre Practice in Directing and an MA in History of Art and Drama from University of Glasgow and Trinity College Dublin, where she wrote her thesis on Samuel Beckett.

Career 
Cartmell moved to Dublin and set up her own company Siren Productions in 2004. She has worked as a freelance director throughout Irish theatre, including at the Abbey Theatre and the Gate Theatre. She was the 2010-1 Artist-in-Residence at the Samuel Beckett Theatre. In 2017, she was announced as the fourth artistic director of the Gate Theatre, where she has since directed three plays: Red Shoes (2018), Assassins (2018) and A Christmas Carol (2019). She directed her first film called The Date in 2017 with funding from RTÉ and Filmbase, which won Best First Short Drama at the Galway Film Fleadh in July 2017.

Awards 
Winner of the Irish Times Theatre Award for Best Director:

 Punk Rock (2014)
 Medea (2010)
 Titus Andronicus (2005)

2018 Irish Tatler Arts and Literature Award

References 

British theatre directors
Women theatre directors
Year of birth missing (living people)
Living people